Ren Fuchen (April 1884 – November 1918) was a Chinese member of the Bolshevik party and a commander of a Chinese regiment of the Soviet Red Army during the Russian Civil War. He joined the Bolsheviks in 1908. He was killed in action during a battle against the White Army forces of Alexander Kolchak. He was known as "China's first Bolshevik". In the aftermath of the Russian Revolution, he raised a regiment of 1,500 Chinese expatriates for the Soviet cause. He was killed in November 1918. The Soviet Union awarded him a Red Flag medal in November 1989, and a statue of him was erected in Tieling, his hometown, in 1993.

References

1884 births
1918 deaths
Generals from Liaoning
Old Bolsheviks
People of the Russian Civil War
People from Tieling
Chinese communists